The Arsenal Firearms "Strike One" is a polymer or Ergal-framed, short recoil operated, striker-fired semi-automatic pistol introduced by the company Arsenal Firearms in 2012. The Strike One is known in Russia as the «Стриж» ("Strizh", Swift bird).

Development
The AF-1 Strike One uses a Bergmann System introduced in the Bergmann–Bayard pistol. Unlike the Browning system, the barrel does not tilt. It is locked with a Y shaped part that during the recoil locks the barrel and bolt and halfway through it drops, releasing the barrel. The barrel stops its motion, the bolt continues back, ejecting the spent cartridge case and loading fresh cartridge and on its way back the Y shaped locking fork reengages and the barrel and bolt move together forward. Instead of tilting the barrel only moves in a straight line, thus increasing the accuracy. 

The Strike one is rated for +P+ ammunition and specifically set up to fire Russian 9×19mm ammunition 7N21 and 7N31 which are close to .357 SIG in their performance. The pistol will be available in: 9×19mm Parabellum, 9×21mm IMI, .357 SIG, and .40 S&W. There is no discussion for 10mm Auto or .45 ACP versions, although a .38 Super version is being considered due to this cartridge's popularity in Italy in particular (Italian laws forbid civilians to have weapons in the same caliber as military and police). A fully automatic version of the Strike One has been offered for the Russian Armed Forces. Longer barreled version (300mm) is also available.

Other 9×19mm Parabellum chambered service pistol designs have higher bore axes like the short recoil, locked breech, tilting barrel Caracal F , Glock 17 , Tanfoglio Force  and Heckler & Koch USP Compact  The short recoil, locked-breech Beretta 92 and short recoil and locked-breech, rotating barrel lock Beretta Px4 Compact designs both have a  bore axis height.

Stryk and Archon variants
At SHOT Show in 2016, Arsenal Firearms announced that they would be partnering with Salient Arms International (SAI) and PRIME Ammunition in the newly formed Prime Manufacturing Group (PMG) to produce in the United States a redesigned version of the pistol known as the Stryk. This newer generation was initially announced to be manufactured and sold by SAI in the US as the Stryk-A full size (same dimensions as the former Strike One) and Stryk-B compact variants, at a lower cost and maintenance and an even greater profit margin.

In 2018, due to a potential trademark dispute, Arsenal Firearms rebrands its US subsidiary Arsenal Firearms USA as Archon Firearms. On the American market, the STRYK-B is named the Archon Type B. Concurrently, SAI still sells the remaining production of the original "Tier One" Strike One on the US market.

Arsenal Firearms originally produced the AF1 Strike One in Italy. Newer STRYK-A of similar dimensions and the more compact STRYK-B (as well as the American variant, Archon Type B), are now manufactured by Swiss company RUAG in Germany and Hungary.

STRYK-A/B and Archon Type B pistols feature Glock-compatible sights with a fiber optic on the front, upgraded gripping surfaces and ergonomics, a redesigned flat-faced and short reset trigger, a different slide profile and other modifications. The compact (B model) has a 15-round magazine.

Gallery

Users
 : The Strike One (or Strizh in Russian) was not adopted as the service pistol in the Russian Federation, even though Spetsnaz troops have been seen wielding them.

References

External links 
 Official US Distributor AMERICAN PRECISION FIREARMS : https://WWW.americanprecisionfirearms.com/
 Arsenal Firearms International website

 Arsenal Firearms European website (featuring STRYK-B)

 Arsenal Firearms Italian website (featuring many variants of the Strike One)

 Archon Firearms website (US subsidiary of Arsenal Firearms, featuring the Archon Type B)

 

9mm Parabellum semi-automatic pistols
.40 S&W semi-automatic pistols
9×21mm IMI semi-automatic pistols
.357 SIG semi-automatic pistols
Semi-automatic pistols of Italy
Semi-automatic pistols of Russia